General elections were held in Guam on November 5, 2002 in order to elect the governor, all 15 members of the Legislature and the Federal delegate to the US Congress. There was also a referendum on raising the age at which alcohol could be bought and consumed to 21. The proposal was rejected by voters.

Background
The elections to the Legislature and multi-member boards were run via open primary (This following the outlawing of the previous blanket primary) similar to Louisiana.

Both the Public Auditor and Consolidated Commission on Utilities were required to be nonpartisan and as such candidates were not allowed to state affiliations or list them on the ballot. In the case of the Auditor, affiliating with a party is grounds for disqualification.

Democratic Party
 Robert A. Underwood, U.S. Delegate Congressman
 Thomas C. Ada, Senator
 Carl Gutierrez (incumbent), Governor of Guam
 Maj. Gen. Benny Paulino, U.S. Soldier of the Guam National Guard

Republican Party
 Felix Perez Camacho, Senator
 Kaleo Moylan, Senator
 Antonio Unpingco, Senator/Speaker of the Guam Legislature
 Eddie Calvo, Senator

Results

Governor

Republican gubernatorial primary

Democratic gubernatorial primary

General Election

Delegate

Democratic primary

General Election

Guam Legislature

Referendum

References

2002
2002 Guam elections
2002 in Guam
Guam
2002
2002 referendums
2002
Prohibition referendums